Seyed Mohammad Hosseini is the name of:
 Mohammad Hosseini (footballer)
 Mohammad Hosseini (politician)
 Seyed Mohammad Hosseini (showman)
 Seyed Mohammad Hosseini (protester)